Jared Solomon (born April 3, 1985) is an American politician from the Democratic Party and is a member of the Maryland House of Delegates representing District 18.

Background 
Solomon attended the University of Pittsburgh, where he received a Bachelor of Arts. Solomon later attended Johns Hopkins University, where he received a Master of Arts in teaching. Solomon is a former policy advisor to Bob Casey Jr. and previously taught social studies at Northwestern High School.

In 2013, Daily Record named Solomon as one of the top 20 leaders in Maryland in their twenties.

In the legislature 
Solomon was sworn in as a member of the Maryland House of Delegates on January 9, 2019, and is a member of the Appropriations Committee, the education and economic development subcommittee, and the oversight committee on personnel.

Solomon is a member of the Maryland Legislative Transit Caucus and is an associate member of both the Maryland Legislative Latino Caucus and the Women Legislators of Maryland.

References

1985 births
Living people
21st-century American politicians
Johns Hopkins University alumni
Democratic Party members of the Maryland House of Delegates
University of Pittsburgh alumni